Xylostiba is a genus of beetles belonging to the family Staphylinidae.

The species of this genus are found in Europe.

Species:
 Xylostiba bosnica (Bernhauer, 1902) 
 Xylostiba congoensis (Bernhauer, 1934)

References

Staphylinidae
Staphylinidae genera